The Abagadasset River is a 16 mile (25.7 km) long tributary of the Kennebec River entirely in Sagadahoc County, Maine. The river starts just south of Gardiner, and flows into Merrymeeting Bay.

See also
List of rivers of Maine

References

Maine Streamflow Data from the USGS
Maine Watershed Data From Environmental Protection Agency

Tributaries of the Kennebec River
Rivers of Sagadahoc County, Maine